Ace Angler: Fishing Spirits is a fishing video game published by Bandai Namco Entertainment. The sequel to the 2019 release Ace Angler, the game was released on the Nintendo Switch in Japan on October 27, 2022 and in western markets on October 28, 2022.

Gameplay
The game is set in an aquarium-themed amusement park and features story, arcade, online multiplayer and party modes.

Development and release
In June 2022, a trailer for Fishing Spirits: Fish & Play Aquarium was shown during the Japanese edition of the Nintendo Direct Mini: Partner Showcase presentation. The game was not mentioned in the Western presentation.

The game was later renamed Ace Angler: Fishing Spirts. An announcement trailer for the game was released on August 15. The game is set to release bundled with a special rod controller.

The game was released in Japan and Asia on October 27, 2022. This version of the game is accompanied by English subtitles. In western markets, the game was released on October 28 via the Nintendo eShop.

Reception

Pre-release 
When describing the game's trailer, Luke Plunkett of Kotaku wrote: "Do not think of, say, Sega Bass Fishing here. This is not intended as an accurate representation of the sport/pastime of fishing. Instead, what you need to do here is imagine that Capcom's Monster Hunter series took over management of the Animal Crossing aquarium."

Critical reception 

Ace Angler: Fishing Spirits received "mixed or average" reviews according to review aggregator Metacritic.

Manga adaptation
A manga adaptation will begin serialization in Shogakukan's Monthly CoroCoro Comic magazine on December 18, 2022.

References

2022 manga
2022 video games
Bandai Namco games
Fishing video games
Manga based on video games
Multiplayer and single-player video games
Multiplayer online games
Nintendo Switch games
Nintendo Switch-only games
Shogakukan manga
Video games developed in Japan